Camille Fischbach (20 April 1932 – 19 March 2020) was a French footballer. He played goalkeeper.

Biography
Fischbach played for 1. FC Saarbrücken from 1952 to 1956, who played in the Oberliga Südwest. After a year off from playing following a spinal injury, he joined US Forbach in 1957. He then played for Olympique de Marseille and FC Metz before retiring in 1960.

Fischbach played 17 matches in Ligue 1 and 64 matches in Ligue 2.

References

1932 births
2020 deaths
French footballers
Association football goalkeepers
Sportspeople from Moselle (department)
1. FC Saarbrücken players
Olympique de Marseille players
FC Metz players
Footballers from Grand Est
French expatriate sportspeople in Germany
Expatriate footballers in Germany
French expatriate footballers